Christ Bongo-Zanoni (born 11 August 1976) is a Congolese former professional football who played as a striker. He played for SV Wilhelmshaven, Hannover 96, Gazélec Ajaccio, FC Aarau, FC Schaffhausen, FC Solothurn, FC Thun and FC 105 Libreville, and also represented the Republic of the Congo internationally.

Club career
Bongo was born in Kinshasa, Zaire. His first European club was SV Wilhelmshaven of the Regionalliga Nord, the third tier of German football. In his single season at the club he made 26 league appearances, scoring six goals. Wilhelmshaven were involved in a struggle against relegation, but Bongo's goals, including a late winner against SV Lurup, helped the club to finish a single place above the relegation zone. During the 1997 close season Bongo joined another Regionalliga Nord side, Hannover 96, signing a three-year contract. His Hannover debut did not come until November, when he played in a 4–0 victory against Sportfreunde Ricklingen.

He continued his nomadic career in France and Switzerland with Gazélec Ajaccio and FC Aarau, before signing for FC Schaffhausen on a one-year contract in 2000. From there he moved to FC Solothurn, where he was top scorer, and scored the winner in a local derby against FC Grenchen. This proved to be his last goal for the club before moving on loan to FC Thun until the winter break.

In 2004, having returned to Africa with Gabonese club FC 105 Libreville, he scored against Cameroon's Bamboutos FC in the final of the Coupe de l'Uniffac, a competition contested by clubs from Central African countries, but finished on the losing side. Bongo's late equalising goal sent the match into extra time, but his team were defeated 6–5 in a penalty shootout.

Bongo signed for Sporting Cabinda in Angola in 2006 and retired in 2008.

International career
Bongo was capped at international level by the Republic of the Congo national team. In January 2001 he scored in a World Cup qualifier against Tunisia, and was one of only three Congolese players to score in the qualifying tournament. The other were Edson Dico Minga and Walter Bakouma; in addition a Malagasy opponent scored an own goal.

References

External links
 

1976 births
Living people
Footballers from Kinshasa
Association football forwards
Republic of the Congo footballers
Republic of the Congo international footballers
Regionalliga players
Championnat National players
Swiss Super League players
Swiss Challenge League players
Serie C players
SV Wilhelmshaven players
Hannover 96 II players
Gazélec Ajaccio players
FC Aarau players
FC Schaffhausen players
FC Solothurn players
FC Thun players
A.C. Prato players
FC 105 Libreville players
Sporting Clube de Cabinda players
Republic of the Congo expatriate footballers
Republic of the Congo expatriate sportspeople in Germany
Expatriate footballers in Germany
Republic of the Congo expatriate sportspeople in France
Expatriate footballers in France
Republic of the Congo expatriate sportspeople in Switzerland
Expatriate footballers in Switzerland
Republic of the Congo expatriate sportspeople in Italy
Expatriate footballers in Italy
Republic of the Congo expatriate sportspeople in Gabon
Expatriate footballers in Gabon
Republic of the Congo expatriate sportspeople in Angola
Expatriate footballers in Angola
21st-century Democratic Republic of the Congo people